Neil Anderson is a Sheffield-based author and journalist. He first came to prominence in the mid-1990s with the Dirty Stop Out's Guide to Sheffield, which was published at the height of the dance club explosion of the era. This tour of Sheffield at night attracted acclaim from titles including The Rough Guide to England, DJ Magazine and The Times.

His Take It to the Limit book is about the venue The Limit, which ran on Sheffield's West Street from 1978 to 1991. Sheffield's Date With Hitler was published in 2010 to commemorate the 70th anniversary of the Sheffield Blitz.  The book formed the basis of BBC1's Sheffield The Forgotten Blitz documentary and followed over a year of research and attempts to explain why the city's munitions works were largely missed by the Luftwaffe on 12 and 15 December 1940. In 2010, Anderson wrote Signing on for the Devil, which chronicled Sheffield's heavy metal music scene in the 1980s. Anderson is a regular contributor to the international music magazine Vive Le Rock.

Background
Sheffield-born Anderson has been a music and entertainment writer/journalist since leaving Sheffield Hallam University in the mid-1990s. He was a Sheffield Telegraph columnist for over a decade and has written for titles spanning The Independent to The Big Issue. Anderson originally started out as a hairdresser but landed a job in Sheffield City Hall's publicity office whilst still at university. He was soon promoted to Sheffield City Council's press office. He left in 2000 to pursue his media career.

Bibliography

Books written by Neil Anderson

 Take It to the Limit (2009)
 Shopaholic's Guide To 1970s Sheffield (2009)
 Dirty Stop Out's Guide To 1970s Sheffield (2010)
 Sheffield's Date With Hitler (2010)
 Signing on for the Devil (2010)
 Facts, Figures & Fallacious Goings-On in Sheffield (2011)
 Dirty Stop Out's Guide to 1960s Sheffield (2011)
 Dirty Stop Out's Guide to 1980s Sheffield  (2011)
 Dirty Stop Out's Guide to 1950s Sheffield  (2012)
 Sheffield City Hall (2012)
 Forgotten Memories From A Forgotten Blitz (2012)
 No Siesta 'Til Club Fiesta (2012)
 Dirty Stop Out's Guide to 1980s Chesterfield (2013)
 Dirty Stop Out's Guide to 1990s Sheffield  (2013)
  The Atkinsons Story (2013)
 Dirty Stop Out's Guide to 1970s Chesterfield (2014)
 Defiant! Sheffield Blitz 75th The Definitive Visuals Guide (2015)
  Dirty Stop Out's Guide to Working Mens' Clubs (2017).

Books edited/published by Neil Anderson

 Get Thi Neck Weshed (2010)
 My Family and other Morticians (2010)
 Gee'or Ruwerin (2011)
 Only So Much (2011)
 Flood Waters (2011)
 Bombs Over Bramall Lane (2011)
 Headlong into Pennilessness  (2011)
 A Woman of Steel  (2012)
 Sheffield's Shocking Past by Chris Hobbs and Matthew Bell (2012)
 Wybourn Black (2012)
 The Charade – The Untold Story (2012)
 Viva Sabella! by Matthew Bell (2012)
 Sheffield's Shocking Past – Part II – The Twentieth Century by Chris Hobbs and Matthew Bell (2012)
 1879 Guide to Sheffield (2012)
 Scared to Death (2013)
 Long Shadows Over Sheffield (2014)
 Dirty Stop Out's Guide to 1970s Barnsley (November 2017)
 Dirty Stop Out's Guide to 1970s Coventry (November 2017)
 Dirty Stop Out's Guide to 1970s Manchester (November 2017)
 Dirty Stop Out's Guide to 1970s Liverpool (November 2017)

References 

English male writers
Living people
Year of birth missing (living people)